Fanny Teijonsalo (born 6 February 1996) is a Finnish swimmer. She competed in the women's 50 metre freestyle event at the 2020 European Aquatics Championships, in Budapest, Hungary, reaching the semi-finals.

References

External links
 
 Florida Gulf Coast Eagles bio
 Arizona State Sun Devils bio

1996 births
Living people
Finnish female freestyle swimmers
Place of birth missing (living people)
Florida Gulf Coast Eagles women's swimmers
Arizona State Sun Devils women's swimmers
Finnish expatriate sportspeople in the United States
Sportspeople from Espoo
Swimmers at the 2020 Summer Olympics
Olympic swimmers of Finland
Competitors at the 2019 Summer Universiade
20th-century Finnish women
21st-century Finnish women